Estadio Alejandro Serrano Aguilar Banco del Austro is a multi-purpose stadium in Cuenca, Ecuador. It is currently used mostly for football matches and is the home stadium of Club Deportivo Cuenca and Liga Deportiva Universitaria de Cuenca. The stadium holds 16,540 spectators and opened in 1945.

Football venues in Ecuador
Copa América stadiums
Estadio Alejandro Serrano Aguilar
Multi-purpose stadiums in Ecuador
Estadio Alejandro Serrano Aguilar
Estadio Alejandro Serrano Aguilar
Sports venues completed in 1945